Mohammad Azam Khan (born March 1, 1969, Karachi, Sindh) is a former Pakistani cricketer who played in one Test and 6 ODIs from 1996 to 1998.

1969 births
Living people
Pakistan One Day International cricketers
Pakistan Test cricketers
Pakistani cricketers
Karachi cricketers
Karachi Whites cricketers
Karachi Blues cricketers
Pakistan National Shipping Corporation cricketers
Pakistan Customs cricketers
Public Works Department cricketers
Pakistani cricket coaches
Cricketers from Karachi